Thynnichthys is a genus of cyprinid fish found in southern Asia from India to Borneo.  There are currently four species in this genus.

Species
 Thynnichthys polylepis Bleeker, 1860
 Thynnichthys sandkhol (Sykes, 1839) (Sandkhol carp)
 Thynnichthys thynnoides (Bleeker, 1852)
 Thynnichthys vaillanti M. C. W. Weber & de Beaufort, 1916

References
 

Cyprinidae genera
Cyprinid fish of Asia